The Volkswagen Concept R is a concept car developed by the German automaker Volkswagen and officially unveiled at the September 2003 Frankfurt Auto Show. It is a study of a sporty two seat roadster, with mid-engine and rear wheel drive.

It is strong enough to accelerate the car from 0 to 100 km/h in 5.3 seconds, and make it reach the electronically limited top speed of 250 km/h (155 mph). Without the speed governor, the car would be even able to reach the top speed of 270 km/h (167 mph). The power is transferred to the road via a six speed direct-shift gearbox.

The designer team for this concept was led by Murat Günak and Peter Schreyer, and broke the ground for the Volkswagen brand in developing the roadster vehicle.

The concept has some interesting design features such as the Volkswagen logo, which is generated digitally by a display and begins to pulsate in the so-called OLED screen when the driver turns on the ignition. When the ignition is activated, the pulse stops.

Also, its seats are not adjustable in any way and the driver must electrically move the polished metal information block of the instrument panel, including the steering wheel and pedal cluster back or forth to find the correct seating position. For the first time in a sports car, the seats are filled with active foam which adapts to the body shape of the driver and passenger.

At a press dinner held during the 2005 North American International Auto Show, Bernd Pischetsrieder, the chairman of the Volkswagen Group, confirmed that Volkswagen intended to build a production vehicle similar to this concept.

External links and references

 RSportsCars.com - with story and both exterior and interior pictures
 Dr. Pischetsrieder confirms Concept R production - from VWvortex

Concept R